The 2010 Republic Cup final took place on 18 July 2010 at the Anjalay Stadium in Mauritius. The match was contested by Pamplemousses SC and Petite Rivière Noire SC. The match was still goalless after extra-time and Pamplemousses SC won the final in the penalty shootout 6–5.

Match

References

Mauritian Republic Cup
Republic Cup